Angelo Raffaele Dinardo (7 January 1932 – 26 February 2015) was an Italian politician. He served as the President of the Italian region of Basilicata from 1995 to 2000, as a member of the now defunct  Italian People's Party (PPI).

Dinardo died in Potenza on 26 February 2015, at the age of 83.

References

1932 births
2015 deaths
Presidents of Basilicata
People from Irsina